Gréta Kácsor (born 24 April 2000) is a Hungarian handballer for Debreceni VSC and the Hungarian national team.

She made her international debut on 28 November 2020 against Sweden. She represented Hungary at the 2020 European Women's Handball Championship.

Achievements 
National team
IHF Women's Junior World Championship:
: 2018
Junior European Championship:
: 2019
European Youth Olympic Festival:
: 2017
IHF Youth World Championship:
: 2018
Youth European Championship:
: 2017

Awards and recognition
 Hungarian Youth Handballer of the Year: 2017, 2018
 All-Star Team Best Left Back of the Junior European Championship: 2019

References

External links

2000 births
Living people
Handball players from Budapest
Hungarian female handball players
21st-century Hungarian women